One Corporate Centre is an office skyscraper in Pasig, Metro Manila, Philippines. It is the 13th-tallest building in the country and Metro Manila as well with a height of 202 metres (662.73 feet)  from ground to tip of architectural antenna. The building has 45 floors above ground including 7 floors for commercial purposes, and 9 basement levels for parking.

One Corporate Centre was designed by Philip H. Recto Architects, and is developed and owned by Amberland Corporation.

Location
The building is located at the corner of Meralco Avenue and Julia Vargas Avenue in the Ortigas Center of Pasig.

Tenants
 Alternatives Food Corp.
 BDO Pasig-Meralco Ave. Branch
 Corporate International Travel & Tours, Inc.
 CPI Outsourcing
 EastWest Bank-Julia Vargas Ave. Branch
 Energy Development Corp.
 FEBC Philippines
 Global Daily Mirror
 I3 Technologies Corp.
 IHI Philippines, Inc.
 Intertek Testing Services Philippines Inc
 KDCI Outsourcing
 MiraMeds Philippines Group, LLC
 NuWorks Interactive Labs
 One Cafe and Events Place
 One Tagaytay Place Vacation Club, Inc.
 Pilipinas Trade Gas, Inc.
 The OML Center
 The Wellex Group, Inc.
 Tsukiden Global Solutions, Inc.

Features and amenities

Amenities inside the building include a Food Court, Executive Dining/Restaurants, Function Rooms with audio-visual facilities, Gallery overlooking Ground Floor lobby for art and other exhibits, Coffee shops, and a Fitness Center.

There will also be a 9 basement levels for parking with paging system, and a helipad at roofdeck.

14 high-speed elevators and 2 service elevators will service the entire building to the office floors and to the parking basements, respectively. There will also be 1 service elevator that will service all floors for other purposes.

It is also serves as a radio transmitter of the FM radio station 98.7 DZFE, owned by Far East Broadcasting Company.

See also 
 List of tallest buildings in the Philippines

References

Skyscrapers in Ortigas Center
Skyscraper office buildings in Metro Manila
Office buildings completed in 2009